Randwick District Rugby Union Football Club, also known as the Galloping Greens, is an Australian rugby union club which competes in the Sydney premier grade rugby union competition. The club was formed in 1882 and since then has won 32 first grade premierships and six Australian club championships. It is one of the traditional powerhouses of the Shute Shield competition, winning 14 titles from 1978 to 1996. Randwick's colours are myrtle green and the club's home ground is Coogee Oval. In the 1980s the club produced many Wallabies, including the  Ella brothers. Its history has seen many of Australia's best players represent the club, including the likes of George Gregan and David Campese. In all, 93 Randwick players have pulled on a Wallaby jersey, and nine have had the honour of captaining their country.

Club information 
Club Name: Randwick District Rugby Union Football Club
Nickname: Galloping Greens, Wicks
Founded:  1882
Home stadium: Coogee Oval
Coach: Ben McCormackClub Captain: Nick WilkinsonUniform colours: Myrtle GreenStatistician:  Ray JenningsHistorian & Archivist:  Bob OuttersideWebsite:  www.randwickrugby.com.auPremiership Titles: (28) 1930, 1934, 1938, 1940, 1948, 1959, 1965, 1966, 1967, 1971, 1973, 1974, 1978, 1979, 1980, 1981, 1982, 1984, 1987, 1988, 1989, 1990, 1991, 1992, 1994, 1996, 2000, 2004Australian Club Champions: (6) 1982, 1983, 1988, 1989, 1991, 1997Melrose Sevens:''' (1) 1990

International representatives
 
 Herb Barker
 Kurtley Beale
 John Brass
 David Campese
 Ken Catchpole
 Roy Cawsey
 Mark Chisholm
 Gary Ella
 Glen Ella
 Mark Ella
 Rocky Elsom
 Ted Fahey
 Russell Fairfax
 Owen Finegan
 John Flett
 Adam Freier
 George Gregan
 Phil Hawthorne
 Stephen Hoiles
 Peter Johnson
 Phil Kearns
 David Knox
 Chris Latham
 Ewen McKenzie
 Bruce Malouf
 Wally Meagher
 Drew Mitchell
 Fosi Pala'amo
 Simon Poidevin
 Tony Daly
 Jeffrey Sayle
 Nick Shehadie
 Gordon Stone
 Dick Tooth
 Cyril Towers
 Morgan Freeman
 Josh Valentine
 Lloyd Walker
 Warwick Waugh
 Chris Whitaker
 Col Windon
 Matt Giteau
 Ken Wright
 Richard Thornett
 Nick Cummins
 Michael Cleary
Richard Costello

Representative coaches
 Michael Cheika -Stade Français Paris head coach ('10-'12); Leinster coach ('05-'10);  Petrarca Padova Coach ('99/'00);  NSW Waratahs Coach ('13-'15); Australia Coach ('14-'19)
 Bob Dwyer - former coach of Australia, NSW, the Leicester Tigers and Bristol
 Gary Ella - Former NSW Assistant Coach; Former Australia A head coach; Former Leinster Coach
 Glen Ella - Incumbent Fijian coach ('09- ); former Fijian Technical Advisor ('08-'09); Former Canadian Assistant Coach 2007, Australian Sevens Head Coach ('94-'95, '97, '99-'00, '05-'07), Australian Assistant coach ('94-'95, '00-'03), ACT Brumbies Technical Adviser ('98-'00) and England Assistant coach  ('16- )
 Owen Finegan - Incumbent Lineout Co-ordinator with the ACT Brumbies ('08-)
 Alan Gaffney - Incumbent Ireland Backs Coach, Leinster Assistant Coach &  part-time Saracens consultant; Former Director of Rugby at Saracens ('06/'07 - '07/'08); former Munster ('02/'03-'04/'05) and Leinster ('00/'01 - '01/'02) Head Coach; former NSW (1997–99) and Australia ('05) Assistant Coach
 Eddie Jones - Coach of Suntory Sungoliath ('96 & '09-12); former Australian ('01-'05), ACT Brumbies ('98-'01), and Queensland Reds ('07) head coach; Springboks Technical Advisor 2007; former Director of Rugby at Saracens ('08-'09); Japan ('12-'15) head coach; England ('15- )
 Ian Kennedy - former NSW and Australian U21 coach
 David Knox - Former assistant Coach for Leinster ('05-'08), the ACT Brumbies ('96-'98),  Petrarca Padova ('99/'00), and South Sydney in the National Rugby League ('03)
 Tim Lane - Incumbent Georgian head coach ('08-'10); former Italian head coach; Australian Assistant coach ('98-'99); Springboks assistant coach ('01-'03); former head coach of Clermont Auvergne  ('00-'01); the Johannesburg Cats ('03-?); Ricoh Black Rams ; CA Brive; and Toulon ('07-?)
 Todd Louden - Head Coach of Ricoh Black Rams; Former attacking coach for NSW ('08) and the Bulls ('07); Randwick ('06); NSW Coach of the Year 2006
 Ewen McKenzie - Head Coach of Australia ('13-'14); Queensland Reds coach ('09- 13); former Stade Français Paris head coach ('08-'09), NSW head coach ('04-'08) & Australian Assistant coach
Jayson Brewer - Assistant Coach Fiji National Team (‘16-‘17) & ARU High Performance Coach, Sydney Rays National Rugby Championship - Forwards Coach, (17), Randwick 1st Grade Defence and Senior Coach (2013-2016) Australian Barbarians Coach(‘2016)

Nearby clubs 
Eastern Suburbs RUFC
Waverley Rugby Club
Colleagues Rugby Club
Alexandria Dukes Rugby Football Club

References

External links 
Randwick Rugby Club, Sydney
Easts Rugby Club, Sydney
Waverley Rugby Club, Bondi, Sydney
Alexandria Dukes Rugby Football Club, Alexandria, Sydney

Rugby union teams in Sydney
Rugby clubs established in 1882
1882 establishments in Australia
Coogee, New South Wales
Randwick, New South Wales